Historikill: 1995–2007 is a compact disc box set by the American thrash metal band Overkill, which was released on October 16, 2015. The originally planned release date was September 18, 2015. The box set spans the years from 1995 to 2007, including seven of the original seventeen Overkill albums from The Killing Kind (1996) to Immortalis (2007), two of their live albums (Wrecking Your Neck and Wrecking Everything), one of their compilation albums (Hello from the Gutter: The Best of Overkill), the covers album Coverkill and a bonus disc featuring demos, remixes and one cover song. The albums are placed in chronological order, although Wrecking Everything was released three months before the Hello from the Gutter compilation album.

Track listing
All songs were written by Bobby "Blitz" Ellsworth and D.D. Verni except where noted.

References

Overkill (band) albums
2015 compilation albums
Nuclear Blast compilation albums
Reissue albums
Thrash metal compilation albums